Atractoceros xanthoprocta is a moth in the family Brachodidae. It was described by Edward Meyrick in 1914. It is found in Malawi and Mozambique.

References

Brachodidae
Moths described in 1914